The Gomateshwar Mahadeva Temple Kerakat (Devanagari: गोमतेश्वर महादेव मंदिर केराकत,  Mandir), meaning "the Great God of the Gomati River", is the largest and most ornate Hindu temple in the medieval temple group found at Kerakat in Uttar Pradesh, India. It is considered one of the best examples of temples preserved from the medieval period in India.

Location
It is situated at the bank of Gomati River in Sihauli village in Kerakat .

About temple
This temple is built in harshvardhan era.but Shivlinga buried by Muslim attackers. Rebuilt in 1990 by some villagers when they found the shivlinga

Hindu temples in Uttar Pradesh
Kerakat